Peter Sean Staats is an American physician, specializing in interventional pain medicine. He is the founder of the Division of Pain Medicine at the Johns Hopkins School of Medicine, and was the Division's chief for nearly a decade. He is a past president of the North American Neuromodulation Society. He is the past president of the New Jersey Society of Interventional Pain Medicine.

He is the author of over four hundred articles, abstracts and book chapters regarding pain management and neuromodulation. He has written or co-edited 11 books on the science and clinical practice of interventional pain medicine. He has written a broad theory of pain with Arthur Staats and Hamid Hekmat that unifies the biology with the psychologic aspects of pain.

Early life and education
Staats is the son of Arthur W. Staats and Carolyn K Staats.  Staats' father was a behavioral psychologist who invented Time Out for early child development and was known for developing a field of psychology termed Psychological Behaviorism. He attended Punahou School in Hawaii from first grade to 12th grade.

Staats attended the University of California at Santa Barbara and studied Physiologic psychology (neuroscience) and biological sciences.

Staats entered the University of Michigan medical school in 1985 and graduated in 1989.  He was accepted for a one-year transitional program at the University of Hawaii (1989) and later in  anesthesia and critical care medicine at Johns Hopkins University in Baltimore (1993). At the conclusion of his residency  program at Johns Hopkins he did a fellowship in pain Medicine. He completed an MBA in Healthcare services at Johns Hopkins University Carey school of business in 2004.

Early career
After completion of a residency and fellowship in pain medicine he developed the  Johns Hopkins division of pain medicine in the department of anesthesia and critical care.  At age 30 was made division chief making him one of the youngest chiefs of academic. He wrote Psychological Behaviorism theory of Pain with his father Arthur and Hamid Hekmat PhD. This approach unified the biological with psychological perspectives in pain and served as a foundation for multidisciplinary and interventional pain used in many pain clinics today. Early research was on mechanisms of placebo effects and intrathecal therapy for cancer related pain.

He has trained numerous fellows residents and Medical students from Johns Hopkins University in interventional pain and placed a highlight on the lack of education on appropriate pain care. He developed an interventional pain track for Anesthesiology including implantation of neuromodulation devices and was the first academic anesthesiologist to have surgical privileges at any academic university in the United States.

Leadership in academic societies
Founding chair:  Interventional pain section  American Society of Anesthesiologists 1996
President Southern Pain Society 2002-2004
President North American Neuromodulation Society 2001-2002
President NJ society of Interventional pain 2014-2015
President American Society of Interventional Pain 2015-2016
Chair Board of Examination World Institute of Pain 2015-2019
Health and Human Services United States Government Subcommittee one alternatives to opioid therapy, pain task force June 18, 2018 -June 2019
President elect World Institute of Pain  2019-2020
President World Institute of Pain 2020–present

Industry
In 2004 he co-founded Premier Pain Centers and served as co managing partner until 2016 when it merged with National Spine and Pain Centers to become the largest cooperative of  pain practices in the United States. He has served as the chief medical officer since 2017. He is also a Co Founder of electroCore in 2005, which has developed non invasive vagus nerve stimulation for a variety of indications.  CE Mark is Bronchoconstriction, Primary headache, gastro intestinal disorders .In the US four approvals FDA clearance in headache for acute treatment of episodic cluster prevention of cluster, acute treatment of migraine and prevention of migraine.  Emergency use application application for vagus nerve stimulation for treatment of COVID related respiratory distress.

Awards and honors

Recipient of “President's Distinguished Service Award,” Southern Pain Society, March 2000
Hugh and Renee Rosomoff Award for Rxcellence in Pain Management  2004
Named in America's Top Doctors, May 2001 - 2019
Named Outstanding Pain Physician of the Year by New York and New Jersey Chapters of the American Society of Interventional Pain Physicians, October 2012.
Recipient of “Clinical Excellence Award”, Pain 2013 Conference, presented by the West Virginia Society of Interventional Pain Physicians, July 2013
Recipient ASIPP Raj Award for Excellence ( ASIPP annual meeting 2017) 
Lifetime Achievement award American Society of Interventional Pain Physicians (ASIPP)  March 2018
Lifetime Achievement Award West Virginia Society of interventional pain, American society of pain and neuroscience June 1, 2018
Lifetime Achievement Award New York and New Jersey Societies of Interventional Pain November 2018
Lifetime Achievement Award North American Neuromodulation Society Las Vegas (Jan 2019)

Further reading

References 

Year of birth missing (living people)
Living people
American pain physicians
University of Michigan Medical School alumni
Johns Hopkins University alumni
Johns Hopkins University faculty
Writers from Honolulu
University of California, Santa Barbara alumni